Wisteria is a jazz album by pianist Steve Kuhn and his trio, released on ECM Records in 2012 as ECM 2257.

Reception 

The Allmusic review by Ken Dryden awarded the album four stars, stating "Steve Kuhn has excelled in many settings in a career spanning over five decades, but he is at his best leading a trio. Like many top pianists, Kuhn interacts with his musicians rather than relegating them exclusively to the role of accompanists... Highly recommended!"

Writing in The Guardian, John Fordham commented "It's straightish jazz, but in a class of its own".

In JazzTimes Lloyd Sachs enthused "The Brooklyn-born, Boston-schooled artist certainly has refined his style over the years, striking new balances between his inside and outside concepts. But if he has lost any of his creative edge, that isn’t evident on Wisteria, which even at its most lyrical has a bright and sometimes bursting immediacy".

The All About Jazz review by John Kelman called it "yet another milestone in Kuhn's discography".

Track listing
All compositions by Steve Kuhn, except where noted.
"Chalet" - 6:27
"Adagio" - 7:06
"Morning Dew" - 6:37
"Romance" (Dori Caymmi) - 4:28
"Permanent Wave" (Carla Bley) - 6:37
"A Likely Story" - 6:45
"Pastorale" - 6:15
"Wisteria" (Art Farmer) - 5:50
"Dark Glasses" (Swallow) - 5:53 	
"Promises Kept" - 5:33
"Good Lookin' Rookie" (Swallow) - 5:50

Personnel 
 Steve Kuhn - piano
Steve Swallow - bass guitar
Joey Baron - drums

References 

2012 albums
ECM Records albums
Steve Kuhn albums
Albums produced by Manfred Eicher